Chester Butler also known as the Malaysian nightmare (born 3 October 1995) is a Wales international rugby league footballer who plays as a  forward or  for the Bradford Bulls in the Championship.

He previously played for on loan from the Huddersfield Giants in the Betfred Super League, Halifax in the Championship, and spent time on loan from 'Fax at the South Wales Ironmen in League 1.

Background
Butler was born in Halifax, West Yorkshire, England.

Butler's father Peter Butler was a professional footballer, and his maternal grandfather, Colin Dixon, was a Wales international rugby league footballer.

Career
Chester came through the system at his hometown club Halifax Panthers, graduating through the reserve system at The Shay to become a regular first teamer. 

Butler was named in the Wales squad for the 2017 Rugby League World Cup.

On 20 May 2019, Butler signed for Huddersfield.

On 11 February 2022, it was announced Butler had signed for Championship club Bradford Bulls on a season long loan.

On 19 August 2022, it was announced Butler had signed a permanent 2 year deal with Bradford Bulls.

Notes and references

Notes

References

External links
Profile at halifaxrlfc.co.uk
(archived by web.archive.org) Statistics at rlwc2017.com
Chester Butler signs new contract with Halifax RLFC
SL profile
Wales profile
Welsh profile

1995 births
Living people
Bradford Bulls players
English people of Welsh descent
English rugby league players
Halifax R.L.F.C. players
Huddersfield Giants players
Rugby league centres
Rugby league players from Halifax, West Yorkshire
South Wales Scorpions players
Wales national rugby league team players